Identity is a British police procedural television series starring Aidan Gillen and Keeley Hawes, airing in the UK during July–August 2010. Concerning identity theft, the series was created and written by Ed Whitmore, a writer most noted for his work on the BBC's Waking The Dead and the acclaimed ITV mini-series He Kills Coppers. The remake rights have been sold to the ABC Network in the United States, which is developing their own version of the show. ITV confirmed that the show had been cancelled on 19 October 2010, after a single series.

Plot
In London, the Identity Unit led by Detective Superintendent Martha Lawson, the founder of the unit, specialises in cases concerning identity fraud by outsmarting, hunting down and unmasking the modern day Jekyll and Hydes.

Martha takes a risk in employing DI John Bloom, an SO-10 officer who has just spent 15 years undercover. He knows first hand what it’s like to pretend to be someone you are not. He’s also only too aware of how easy it is to lose your own identity when you’ve lived a lie for the previous 15 years as a Dublin money launderer and bagman for the Turkish mafia and the past will not go away.

Completing the team are Tessa Stein, IT expert in everything from trawling databases to cracking security codes, DS Anthony Wareing, who has his eye on promotion and a stance on cases that can err on the self-righteous, and DC José Rodriguez - cocky, self-assured, yet with a seriousness and sensitivity that gives him insight into cases.

As the series unfolds, DS Wareing becomes more and more concerned about Bloom’s methods and frustrated by what he sees as Martha’s blind and foolish indulgence of him.

Cast and characters
Aidan Gillen as DI John Bloom
Keeley Hawes as DSI Martha Lawson
Holly Aird as Tessa Stein
Elyes Gabel as DC Jose Rodriguez
Shaun Parkes as DS Anthony Wareing
Patrick Baladi as AC Hugh Wainwright

Episode list

Official ratings include the ITV HD simulcast audience.

References

External links

2010 British television series debuts
2010 British television series endings
2010s British police procedural television series
English-language television shows
Television series by ITV Studios
ITV television dramas
2010s British television miniseries
Television shows set in London
Identity theft in popular culture